Deolinda Fernanda da Silva Marques (born 15 April 1966) is a Portuguese long-distance runner. She competed in the women's 10,000 metres at the 1992 Summer Olympics.

References

1966 births
Living people
Athletes (track and field) at the 1992 Summer Olympics
Portuguese female long-distance runners
Olympic athletes of Portugal
Place of birth missing (living people)